Vitreoscilla haemoglobin (VHb) is a type of haemoglobin found in the Gram-negative aerobic bacterium, Vitreoscilla. It is the first haemoglobin discovered from bacteria, but unlike classic hemoglobin it is composed only of a single globin molecule.

Discovery

VHb was first discovered by Dale Webster in 1966 from a Vitreoscilla species. Being a soluble protein, and its close similarities of its spectral properties to those of bacterial cytochrome oxidase (cytochrome o), it was initially identified as “soluble cytochrome o”. The real nature of VHb as a hemoglobin rather than a soluble cytochrome was resolved only after the amino acid sequence determined in 1986. The amino acid sequence revealed that it is made up of a single globin domain without additional structural elements, in contrast to typical haemoglobin. Yet the solution of its crystal structure confirmed that the three-dimensional structure of is remarkably similar to the classic globin fold.

VHb is produced by the gene (vgb) which was cloned in 1988.

Function

VHb is the best understood of all the bacterial haemoglobins, and is attributed to play a number of functions. Its main role is likely the binding of oxygen at low concentrations and its direct delivery to the terminal respiratory oxidase(s) such as cytochrome o. It is also involved in the delivery of oxygen to oxygenases, detoxification of NO by converting it to nitrate, and sensing oxygen concentrations and passing this signal to transcription factors. It has a peroxidase-like activity and effectively eliminate autoxidation-derived H2O2, which is a cause of haeme degradation and iron release.

References

Hemoglobins